Lysiostyles is a monotypic genus of flowering plants belonging to the family Convolvulaceae. The only species is Lysiostyles scandens.

Its native range is Northern South America to Northern Brazil.

References

Convolvulaceae
Monotypic Convolvulaceae genera